KZIM (960 AM) is a radio station licensed to serve Cape Girardeau, Missouri, United States. The station is owned by Max Media and licensed to MRR License LLC. It airs a news and talk format.

KZIM features radio programming such as the syndicated Coast to Coast AM, The Sean Hannity Show, The Mark Levin Show.

History
KZIM was the region's first radio station. The Hirsch Battery and Radio Company, headed by Oscar Hirsch, put KFVS 1340 on air in 1925. In 1928, it moved to 1210 kHz and began sharing the frequency with another station, WEBQ in Harrisburg, Illinois, which also was moved from 1340. KFVS operated with 250 watts during the day and 100 watts at night, moving to full-time 250-watt operation in  For special occasions, such as political events, Easter church ceremonies and football games, KFVS received permission to operate simultaneously with WEBQ.

In the late 1930s, KFVS sought to go full-time on 1210 if WEBQ was moved to 1310; this was denied. In 1940, KFVS finally broke out of the time share with WEBQ and moved to 1370 kHz. It was not there long before NARBA reallocation resulted in yet another frequency change, to 1400 kHz. In 1947, KFVS moved one last time to its present frequency of 960 kHz, accompanied by a power increase to 500 watts at night and 1,000 watts during the day. This move enabled the 1400 frequency to be reused for a new station in Sikeston, KSIM, the current simulcast partner of KZIM. Hirsch held a minority stake in KSIM until 1961, when he divested it as a condition of KFVS going to 5,000-watt operation on 960. KFVS also expanded to television when KFVS-TV went on the air in 1954.

The KFVS callsign was retired from radio on June 1, 1979, when the station became KGIR as a result of Hirsch selling the television station. Six years later, the Hirsch family sold the station to the Zimmer family, earning a handsome return on Oscar Hirsch's investment of 60 years earlier. The Zimmers gave the station its current calls, KZIM.

In December 2003, Mississippi River Radio, acting as Max Media LLC (John Trinder, president/COO), reached an agreement to purchase WCIL, WCIL-FM, WUEZ, WXLT, WOOZ-FM, WJPF, KGIR, KZIM, KEZS-FM, KCGQ-FM, KMAL, KLSC, KWOC, KJEZ, KKLR-FM, KGKS, and KSIM from the Zimmer Radio Group (James L. Zimmer, owner). The reported value of this 17-station transaction was $43 million.

References

External links
KZIM official website

ZIM
News and talk radio stations in the United States
Cape Girardeau, Missouri
Radio stations established in 1985
Max Media radio stations
1985 establishments in Missouri